Gymnoglossa munroi is a species of tachinid flies in the genus Gymnoglossa of the family Tachinidae.

References

Tachinidae